Geraldine is a town in the Canterbury region in the South Island of New Zealand. It is about 140 km south of Christchurch, and inland from Timaru, which is 38 km to the south. Geraldine is located on State Highway 79 between the Orari and Hae Hae Te Moana Rivers and 45 kilometres to the east of Fairlie.

History
There is evidence of Māori travels through the Geraldine area and artifacts and carvings have been discovered in the nearby areas of Beautiful Valley, Gapes Valley and Kakahu. The area was part of the continuous Canterbury Purchase or Kemp's Deed whereby over thirteen million acres was purchased by Henry Tacy Kemp on behalf of the Crown from Ngāi Tahu for £2,000 in 1848. Following the purchase the colonial surveyor Charles Torlesse visited the region in 1849. However, it wasn't until 1854 when Thomas Cass, the Chief Surveyor for the Canterbury region and Guise Brittan, Commissioner for Crown Lands, proposed a town site at Talbot Forest. Following this Samuel Hewlings under the employment of the government as a surveyor, constructed a bark hut where the probably future site of a town would be. In fact, a totara tree planted to commemorate the birth of Hewling's daughter with his wife Nga Hei, still stands today opposite the police station where his nearby bark hut once stood. While Hewlings was indeed the first to person to live in Geraldine, his residence was not permanent and Alfred Cox and William du Moulin abet on the other side of the river in Raukapuka were the town's first permanent residents. The town which up until 1857 was known as Talbot Forest was firstly named Fitzgerald in honor of James FitzGerald, the first Superintendent of  the Canterbury Province. However, this was later changed to Geraldine though the exact reasoning for this is unknown.

Growth in the township was slow at first with separate towns being constructed such as Healey Town in present-day south Geraldine, Maslin Town between Kennedy and Hislop Street and the German settlement known as German Town on the Downs. By 1862 most of the main streets had been named and sections surveyed and the area gazetted in 1867. At this time timber milling and the numerous sheep runs in the area were the main sources of commerce. The town experienced significant growth during this period and as the timber ran out farming took over as the major source of income in the area.

In  December 1904, Geraldine was constituted a borough.

Surroundings

Talbot Forest 
Within walking distance of the town centre is Talbot Forest Scenic Reserve. Talbot Forest is the last remaining remnants of a vast native forest that covered Geraldine and surrounding areas. The reserve is home to an impressive variety of native hardwoods, including matai, kahikatea and totara, including one estimated to be 800 years old.

Native reserves 
The Geraldine area is home to numerous native reserves within driving distance. These include Kakahu Bush Reserve, Orari Gorge Scenic Reserve, Peel Forest Park Scenic Reserve, Pioneer Park Conservation Area, Tenehaun Conservation Area, and Waihi Gorge Scenic Reserve.

Bats 
There are a number of colonies of the native long-tailed bat in the areas surrounding Geraldine (such as Talbot Forest and Hanging Rock). The 2019 Geraldine Festival took the opportunity to highlight the long-tailed bat by having the theme of "Geraldine's Gone Batty"

Education
Geraldine has two schools:

Geraldine Primary School is a decile 8 state co-educational contributing school, with 296 students (as of October 2022)

Geraldine High School (est 1963) is a decile 8 state co-educational secondary school that provides for students years 7 through 13, with 605 students (as of October 2022)

Government

Local government 
Geraldine became a Town District in 1884, operating out of the historic Town Board Office. In 1904, Geraldine was constituted a borough. Presently, Geraldine is part of the Timaru District Council led by current mayor Nigel Bowen. Geraldine is represented by a community board and a councillor.

Central government 
The Geraldine Electorate was first formed in the 1875–1876 election but would be twice disestablished and subsequently reestablished in the following years before being abolished in the 1911 election. The electorate was represented by six Members of Parliament. The electorate split between the newly established Temuka Electorate, however, majority of the land went to the Ashburton Electorate. Following controversial boundary changes in 2008, the Aoraki Electorate abolished and Geraldine became part of the Waitaki electorate with its head office in Oamaru despite nearby towns such as Temuka, Orari and Ashburton joining the Timaru based Rangitata electorate. Geraldine is currently part of the Waitaki electorate held by Jacqui Dean of the National Party.

Demographics 

Geraldine had a population of 2,706 at the 2018 New Zealand census, an increase of 306 people (12.8%) since the 2013 census, and an increase of 309 people (12.9%) since the 2006 census. There were 1,173 households, with 1,179 occupied private dwellings and a further 108 unoccupied private dwellingsThere were 1,254 males and 1,449 females, giving a sex ratio of 0.87 males per female. The median age was 48.6 years (compared with 37.4 years nationally), with 498 people (18.4%) aged under 15 years, 357 (13.2%) aged 15 to 29, 1,068 (39.5%) aged 30 to 64, and 786 (29.0%) aged 65 or older.

Ethnicities were 94.7% European/Pākehā, 7.2% Māori, 1.0% Pacific peoples, 2.3% Asian, and 1.6% other ethnicities (totals add to more than 100% since people could identify with multiple ethnicities).

The proportion of people born overseas was 16.2%, compared with 27.1% nationally.

Although some people objected to giving their religion, 48.8% had no religion, 41.0% were Christian, 0.1% were Hindu, 0.2% were Buddhist and 1.3% had other religions.

Of those at least 15 years old, 324 (14.7%) people had a bachelor or higher degree, and 543 (24.6%) people had no formal qualifications. The median income was $27,400 (with 13.5% earning over $70,000), compared with $31,800 nationally. The employment status of those at least 15 was that 939 (42.5%) people were employed full-time, 354 (16.0%) were part-time, and 42 (1.9%) were unemployed.

In 1951, the population of Geraldine was 1080 people. This increased to 1640 people in 1956 and 1832 people in 1961.

Entertainment and media

Movies are shown at the historic Geraldine Cinema (est. 1924), located on Talbot St.  There is a desire to see that the cinema, which in a previous life was the Geraldine Town Hall become a registered historic building. It was first building in Geraldine to be wired up for electricity.

Geraldine's first radio station, Z100FM, operated in 1999-2000. This changed to Four Peaks FM in 2001. Just Country FM currently broadcasts from the town.

Amenities

Golf courses 
There are two golf courses in Geraldine: The Geraldine District Golf Course and the Grande Vue Golf Course.

Swimming pool 
The Geraldine summer pool is an outdoor pool that is open between November and March each year. It is located on Cox Street. The complex features a heated 25 metre long, six lane swimming pool, a learners pool and a toddlers pool. The Geraldine summer pool is home to the Geraldine Amateur Swimming Club which offers swimming lessons and also competes in various New Zealand swimming competitions.

Geraldine domain 
The Geraldine domain is located between Cox street and Talbot street. At just over eleven hectares in size, the domain includes a playground, pavilion, gardens and the Serpentine Creek. There are a number of sports grounds based at the domain. These include grounds for playing cricket, football and athletics. There are also tennis courts, netball courts and a bowls club. Fundraising was occurring in late 2021 to raise just over $1 million to redevelop Geraldine domain. The aim of the project is to lay artificial turf to provide a hockey training facility. as well as install new cricket nets, new signage, storage facilities, floodlights and parking.

Library 
The Geraldine library is located at 80 Talbot street. It is open Monday to Fridays and on Saturday mornings. In late 2021, the library was repainted and new carpet was installed. This was the first refurbishment that the library had received since it was first opened in 2003.

Economy

Agricultural 
The agricultural industry is at the heart of the local economy. In the 1960s sheep farming was the most common type of farming with some mixed farming (including wheat), dairy farming, and market gardening also present. While there has been a substantial increase in dairy farms in the region over the last twenty years, there are still large sectors involved in the cropping, deer, sheep and beef. Many small local businesses service the needs of the surrounding agricultural industry. Large agricultural processing facilities operate in the area include Fonterra's Clandeboye facility and Barkers of Geraldine as well as numerous smaller industrial operations. Geraldine is also home to Barkers which both grows the fruit and produces jams, chutney, sauces, syrups and blackcurrant juice from it.

Tourism 
Geraldine is the gateway for many international and domestic tourists on their way from Christchurch down to the Mackenzie Country, the Southern Lakes District or the popular tourist destinations of Queenstown and Wānaka. There are numerous cafes, restaurants and shops which cater for tourists all year round. The town is also home to various tourist operators which showcase the local natural environment such as rafting, horse trekking and tours.

Museums

Geraldine vintage car & machinery museum 
The Geraldine Vintage Car & Machinery Museum has over 1400 exhibits including 101 tractors, a 1929 Spartan biplane and more than 50 vintage cars. It is located at 178 Talbot Street. In late 2021, the museum opened a new display in what was the meeting room which includes 24 pedal cars and a collection of miniature trains, tractors and airplanes. The majority of the eighty members of the museum come from Geraldine and there are plans to expand the museum further in order to display more items.

Route 79 museum 
The Route 79 Museum is located just outside of Geraldine at 10 Craig Road. The collection includes old motorbikes, horse buggies, a 1963 International Australian Army truck, a field gun purchased from the New Zealand Army all over the South Island.

Geraldine historical museum 
The Geraldine Historical Museum aims to display the history of the Geraldine area. It is located on Cox Street in the Town Board Office building.

Churches

Saint Andrew's 
Saint Andrew's Presbyterian Church is located on 10 Cox Street in Geraldine. The church is built of local stone and was opened in 1950.

Saint Mary's 
Saint Mary's Anglican Church is at 77 Talbot Street. Although the parish is centred in Geraldine, there are four other churches within the parish: These are St Thomas’ in Woodbury; St Anne’s in Pleasant Valley; St Stephen’s in Peel Forest and Holy Innocents at Mt Peel. In 1864, the first Anglican church was built in Geraldine, with the current church being built in 1899. St Mary's church is listed as a category two historic place with Heritage New Zealand

Immaculate Conception 
The Catholic Church known as St Mary Mackillop Parish – Immaculate Conception Church is located at 19 Hislop Street. It was opened in 1935 and cost £10,000 to build. The church can seat up to 300. The altar is made of Oamaru stone. The building is constructed of reinforced concrete and brick.

Notable buildings

Town board office 
The Town Board Office on Cox street,  is now part of the Geraldine Historical Museum. It was originally built on Talbot Street in 1885 and cost 269 pounds in construction costs. It was designed by the architect D. McKenzie and built by Dierck and White. When Geraldine became a borough in 1905, the building was used by the Borough Council. It served the town until 1969 and it was then dismantled and re-erected in 1975 on Cox street  by the Geraldine Historical Society to be used as part of the museum. The building is made of bluestone.

McKechnie's cottage 
This modest cottage  with a small outhouse in the backyard on Wilson street was built in 1873 by Hugh Morrison. It is one of the oldest buildings in Geraldine and it was built using plaster and lath. Between 1896 and 1902, it was used as a tailor's shop. In 1941, Douglas McKechnie bought it and lived in it for 47 years. He was the mayor of Geraldine between 1939 and 1949.

Crown hotel 
The Crown hotel is now trading as the Geraldine Heritage Hotel and located at 31 Talbot street. The original building was destroyed by a fire and the current building was built in 1906. It is listed as a category two historic place with Heritage New Zealand.

St Mary's vicarage 
The St Mary's vicarage is located on Talbot street. The Arts and Crafts house was built in 1900 and restored in 2019. The restoration was a finalist in the ‘domestic saved and restored’ category of the Canterbury Heritage Awards. It was listed as a category two historic place in 1983.

Post office 
The post office was opened in November 1908 by the then  prime minister Sir Joseph Ward. The two storied building located on the intersection of Talbot street and Cox street provided a mail room, public office, postmaster's room, telephone room and private boxes on the ground floor and quarters for the post master on the first floor. In 1997, the post office moved to different premises and the building was sold in 2005 for  $349,500 at auction. It has been used by a variety of retail businesses since then. It is listed as a category two historic place with Heritage New Zealand.

Heritage listed buildings 
The town has other category two heritage listed buildings, which include
Brick Cottage, 137 Talbot street
Corner shop (Talbot street)
Corner shop cottage (Talbot street)
Geraldine Co-operative Cheese Factory (Pleasant Valley road)

Notable people
 John Badcock, artist
Thomas Buxton, politician
Frederick Flatman, politician
 Jordan Luck, musician
 Hayden Paddon, rally driver
William Postlethwaite, politician
 Annabel Ritchie, rower
William Rolleston, politician
 Gus Spillane, former All Black
Edward Wakefield, politician
 Peter Williams, broadcaster

Notes

References

External links

The current weather in Geraldine

Timaru District
Populated places in Canterbury, New Zealand